Goffredo Bettini (born 5 November 1952) is an Italian politician, founding member of the Democratic Party (PD). As mentor and closest advisor of PD's former secretary, Nicola Zingaretti, Bettini is considered one of the most influential and powerful politician within the party.

Biography
Goffredo Maria Bettini was born in Rome in 1952; he is a descendant of the Rocchi Bettini Camerata Passionei Mazzoleni, an aristocratic family from Marche. During the 1970s, he joined in the Italian Communist Youth Federation (FGCI), where he met Walter Veltroni, to whom he will always be very close.

From 1977 to 1979, Bettini served as the Roman secretary of the FGCI and subsequently entered in the national secretariat of the federation, in the years in which Massimo D'Alema was serving national secretary. From 1986 to 1990, he was city secretary of the Italian Communist Party (PCI) in Rome and in 1989, he was elected municipal councilor with the PCI. He retained his two posts after the "Bolognina change" and the consequent birth of the Democratic Party of the Left (PDS). In 1993, he was elected to the Chamber of Deputies for the first time, taking over from the resigning Vincenzo Recchia.

In 1993, he was the strategist of Francesco Rutelli's candidacy for mayor of Rome, who was elected in the second round in December, defeating the right-wing candidate, Gianfranco Fini. In the 1994 general election, Bettini run in the single-member constituency of Rome–Prenestino–Centocelle, for the Chamber of Deputies, within the Alliance of Progressives, but he was not elected. In the 1996 general election, he run in the proportional lists for the Chamber of Deputies, and he failed in being elected.

In 1997, following Francesco Rutelli's second victory in the municipal election, Bettini was appointed responsible for institutional relations of the municipality; he resigned from this position after two years to become president of the Rome Auditorium. In the 2000 Lazio regional election, he arrived was elected in the regional council, for the Democrats of the Left (DS), the heir of the PDS. In 2001, he was re-elected to the Chamber and became a member of the national secretariat of the DS, while in the 2006 Italian general election, Bettini was elected senator for the first time.

On 4 November 2007, after the foundation of the Democratic Party (PD), Bettini was appointed party's coordinator of by the new secretary, Walter Veltroni. On 28 November 2007, he resigned from the office of senator to devote himself fully to party's activity. He held the office of coordinator until Veltroni's resignation in February 2009.

In 2014, he ran for the European election with the PD in the Central Italy constituency, being elected with 90,462 preferences.

Since 2019, when Nicola Zingaretti was elected secretary of the PD, Bettini became one of the most influential politicians within the party, as well as his closest advisor.

Electoral history

First-past-the-post elections

References

1952 births
Living people
Democratic Party of the Left politicians
Italian Communist Party politicians
Democratic Party (Italy) politicians
Democratic Party (Italy) MEPs